Greenfield Township is one of seventeen townships in Adair County, Iowa, USA.  At the 2010 census, its population was 2,072.

History
Greenfield Township was first settled in 1854. This township was organized in 1859.

Geography
According to the USGS, it contains one cemetery, Greenfield.

References

External links
 US-Counties.com
 City-Data.com

Townships in Adair County, Iowa
Townships in Iowa
1854 establishments in Iowa